9 is the 5th French album and 7th studio album in total to be released by the singer Lara Fabian.

The album is considered by many as a shift in Lara's music style, and vocal performance, primarily because it was Lara's first album that long time producer, Rick Allison, did not produce.  The Album was produced by Jean-Félix Lalanne.  He also, with Fabian, composed many of the songs in the album.

Special digipack editions of the album included a DVD of music videos for most of the songs on the album.

The album was followed by the "Un Regard 9" tour, which totaled over 60 concerts.

Track listing

Special edition DVD track listing
 "Je me souviens"
 "Il ne manquait que toi"
 "Si tu n'as pas d'amour"
 "Un Ave Maria"
 "Les Homéricains" – duet with Melissa Mars
 "Ne lui parlez plus d'elle"
 "Speranza"
 "L'homme qui n'avait pas de maison"
 "La Lettre"

Charts

Certifications and sales

External links 
 Official Site

References

2005 albums
Lara Fabian albums